Henry Pfaltz van Ameringen (October 19, 1930 – September 9, 2020) was an American philanthropist.

Early life and family
Henry van Ameringen was born on October 19, 1930, in South Orange, New Jersey in a wealthy family, with his father among the founders of International Flavors and Fragrances.

Career and philanthropy
In 1985, he helped to found an organization called God's Love We Deliver that provides meals to people with AIDS. He also served as an executive of International Flavors & Fragrances.

During his lifetime, van Ameringen donated around $200 million to LGBT and AIDS-related causes and supported organizations such as Lambda Legal, GMHC (formerly Gay Men's Health Crisis), and God's Love We Deliver.

Recognition
 Funders for LGBTQ Issues (2017)

References

1930 births
2020 deaths
LGBT people from New Jersey
People from South Orange, New Jersey